Altamirano is a village in Guanajuato, Mexico.

References

Populated places in Guanajuato